Belorusskaya Delovaya Gazeta (BDG; English: "Belarusian Business Newspaper") is a now-defunct, business-oriented daily Russian-language newspaper based in Minsk, Belarus, known for its criticisms of President Alexander Lukashenko's government.

Kalinkina's editorship
In 2003, its editor was Svetlana Kalinkina. The paper began to publish reports and features critical of Lukashenko's government, including a series on the trial of Viktor Kazeko, former director of the state food company, a story on the corruption trial of former Minsk Tractor Works director Mikhail Leonov, and a poll asking readers whether Lukashenko should be allowed to have his presidential plane for personal use. Reporter Iryna Khalip's articles on official corruption led to a brief suspension of the newspaper's printing rights for "insulting the honor and dignity of the president".

Soon the paper was reportedly subject to a campaign of official harassment, including "politically motivated tax inspections, death threats and detentions". Belarus's Information Ministry began to harass any printer that agreed to work with the paper, forcing BDG to print in Smolensk, Russia. The print edition of BDG had largely disappeared from Belarus by September 2004, leaving only the website.

Kalinkina then took a leave of absence from the paper to work against a national referendum that would eliminate presidential term limits, allowing Lukashenko to serve indefinitely. The referendum passed, and Kalinkina took a new position at Narodnaya Volya.

In 2004, the Committee to Protect Journalists awarded Kalinkina its International Press Freedom Award, "an annual recognition of courageous journalism", for her work with BDG. The award citation praised her "critical reporting on various government abuses" in the face of "years of legal and bureaucratic harassment from Belarusian authorities".

Print run cancellation
On 13 March 2006, a week before the presidential election that would usher in Lukashenko's third term, BDG, Narodnaya Volya, and Tovarishch had their print runs abruptly cancelled by their Smolensk supplier. Kalinkina told The New York Times that she believed Belarusian government pressure to be responsible, saying, "When, a week before the election, someone refuses to print three papers, it is clear there are political reasons."

Shortly after, increasing financial pressures forced the paper's closure.

References 

Defunct newspapers published in Belarus
Business newspapers
Mass media in Minsk
Business in Belarus
Free Media Awards winners